Sylvain Caudron (born 10 September 1969) is a French racewalker. He competed in the men's 50 kilometres walk at the 2000 Summer Olympics.

References

1969 births
Living people
Athletes (track and field) at the 2000 Summer Olympics
French male racewalkers
Olympic athletes of France
Place of birth missing (living people)